Fred Archer (1915–1999) was an English farmer and author.

Archer's literary career began following a talk he gave to his local Guild, as a replacement speaker. Having written and read out a humorous story, he was encouraged by the response of his audience. Archer's first book, The Distant Scene, was published in 1967, 'Under the Parish Lantern' followed in 1969. In the following three decades, he went on to publish books at the rate of almost one a year, describing the rural England he knew, and the characters within.

References

External links
 Fred Archer website

20th-century English farmers
English humorists
English non-fiction writers
1915 births
1999 deaths
English male non-fiction writers
20th-century British non-fiction writers
20th-century English male writers